The 2014 ICF World Junior and U23 Canoe Slalom Championships took place in Penrith, Australia from 23 to 27 April 2014 under the auspices of the International Canoe Federation (ICF) at the Penrith Whitewater Stadium. It was the 16th edition of the competition for Juniors (U18) and the 3rd edition for the Under 23 category.

No medals were awarded for the men's U23 C2 team event and the women's junior and U23 C1 team events due to low number of participating nations. The men's junior C2 team event did not take place.

Medal summary

Men

Canoe

Junior

U23

Kayak

Junior

U23

Women

Canoe

Junior

U23

Kayak

Junior

U23

Medal table

References
Official results

External links
International Canoe Federation

ICF World Junior and U23 Canoe Slalom Championships
ICF World Junior and U23 Canoe Slalom Championships